The Market Identifier Code (MIC) (ISO 10383) is a unique identification code used to identify securities trading exchanges, regulated and non-regulated trading markets. The MIC is a four alphanumeric character code, and is defined in ISO 10383 by the International Organization for Standardization (ISO). For example, the US NASDAQ market is identified by MIC code XNAS.

ISO 10383
ISO 10383 is the ISO standard that "specifies a universal method of identifying exchanges, trading platforms and regulated or non-regulated markets as sources of prices and related information in order to facilitate automated processing". The FIX Protocol uses MICs to denote values of the "Fix Exchange" data type. Markets of various asset classes, including equities, options and futures apply for MICs through the ISO.

MICs are updated frequently and the latest published list is available at the maintenance organization of ISO 10383 in various formats: Excel, CSV, XML and PDF. These also include Modified and Deactivated MICs, as well as change lists since the last published update.

Exchange (operating MIC) vs Market (MIC) 

MIC codes are allocated at two levels:
 Exchange (operating MIC).
 E.g. NASDAQ has code XNAS
 Market (MIC), where the exchange's operating MIC is also used as MIC of its main market or "all" markets. E.g. NASDAQ markets have these MICs:
 XNAS: NASDAQ - All Markets
 XNCM: NASDAQ Capital Market
 XNDQ: NASDAQ Options Market
 XNFI: NASDAQ Fixed Income Trading
 XNGS: NASDAQ/NGS (Global Select Market)
 XNIM: NASDAQ Intermarket

ISO 10383 specifies all MIC codes and is updated regularly.

Market Categories 

MIC also standardizes codes for categories of markets or facilities, as follows:
 APPA: Approved Publication Arrangement
 ARMS: Approved Reporting Mechanism
 ATSS: Alternative Trading System
 CASP: Crypto Asset Services Provider (Cryptocurrency exchanges and related facilities)
 CTPS: Consolidated Tape Provider
 DCMS: Designated Contract Market
 IDQS: Inter-Dealer Quotation System (e.g. OTC Markets Group and the Consolidated Quotation System)
 MLTF: Multilateral Trading Facility
 OTFS: Organised Trading Facility
 RMKT: Regulated Market (e.g. a regulated Stock Exchange)
 RMOS: Recognised Market Operator
 SEFS: Swap Execution Facility
 SINT: Systematic Internaliser (as defined in Directive 2014/65/EU, e.g. XTX Markets)
 TRFS: Trade Reporting Facility

(plus extra codes NSPD Not Specified and OTHR Other)

See also 
List of finance topics
International Securities Identifying Number (ISIN)
SEDOL
CUSIP
Ticker symbol
Central Index Key
ISO 6166
ISO 10962
NSIN

Notes

External links
 Complete list of Market Identifier Codes (PDF format) (CSV format) (Retrieved May, 2020)

ISO standards
Financial markets
Financial metadata
Security identifier types